Edwin Paul "Ed" Dyck (October 29, 1950 – January 18, 2017) was a Canadian ice hockey goaltender. He played 62 games for the Vancouver Canucks of the National Hockey League from 1972 until 1974. Dyck also played three seasons with the Seattle Totems of the senior Western Hockey League and one season with the Indianapolis Racers of the World Hockey Association. He ended his career playing the season 1975–1976 in the Swedish Division 1 (2nd tier) team Bodens BK. Dyck died of cancer in 2017.

Career statistics

Regular season and playoffs

Awards
 WCHL All-Star Team – 1971

References

External links

1950 births
2017 deaths
Calgary Centennials players
Canadian ice hockey goaltenders
Ice hockey people from Saskatchewan
Indianapolis Racers players
People from Warman, Saskatchewan
Rochester Americans players
Seattle Totems (WHL) players
Vancouver Canucks draft picks
Vancouver Canucks players